Jonas Jerebko (born March 2, 1987) is a Swedish professional basketball player. He was selected as the 39th overall pick in the second round of the 2009 NBA draft by the Detroit Pistons, becoming the second Swedish-born basketball player (after Miles Simon) to be selected in the NBA draft. Jerebko played a total of 10 seasons in the NBA with four different teams, the Detroit Pistons, Boston Celtics, Utah Jazz and Golden State Warriors. Jerebko most recently played for Russian club Khimki, where he spent two seasons.

Early life
As a child growing up in Sweden, Jerebko was involved in many sports, but he excelled at basketball. Having parents who played basketball was good for Jerebko because there was very little interest in the game among his friends. He moved to Massachusetts during his Senior Year for a better opportunity He would attend Norwood High School for his Senior Year and would impress on the court, receiving a few different offers.

In 2005, Jerebko signed to play basketball at the University at Buffalo in his father's hometown. Ultimately, he gave up a basketball scholarship for a professional career.

Professional career

Europe (2005–2009)
Jerebko began his career playing with second-tiered Swedish club Borås Basket in the 2005–06 season before joining first-tiered Swedish club Plannja Basket for the 2006–07 season. He averaged 20.0 points, 11.6 rebounds and 2.6 blocks in 19 games for Borås, and 10.0 points and 5.0 rebounds in 22 games for Plannja.

In 2007, Jerebko moved to Italy where he joined Angelico Biella, playing for the club for two seasons.

Detroit Pistons (2009–2015)
In May 2009, ESPN analyst Fran Fraschilla considered Jerebko one of the top five European prospects in the 2009 NBA draft. He was subsequently selected with the 39th overall pick by the Detroit Pistons, becoming the second Swedish national player to be selected in the NBA after the Swedish-born American Miles Simon. His career in the NBA got off to a rough-and-tumble start; in a preseason game, Jerebko was accused of punching NBA veteran Jamaal Magloire in the face. Both players were suspended for the opening game of the regular season game for the ensuing fight. Jerebko's hustle and determination early on in 2009–10 made him a fan favorite. He was selected as a member of the Rookie Team as part of the 2010 Rookie Challenge and Youth Jam during the NBA All-Star Weekend. He appeared in 80 games (73 starts) for the Pistons as a rookie, averaging 9.3 points (.481 FG, .313 3FG), 6.0 rebounds, 0.7 assists and 0.99 steals in 27.9 minutes per game. He was among NBA rookie leaders ranked third in rebounds (6.0 rpg), fourth in blocks (0.36 bpg), fifth in minutes (27.9 mpg), eighth in steals (0.99 spg), 10th in scoring (9.3 ppg) and T-18 in assists (0.7 apg). His 73 games as a starter ranks second in franchise history amongst rookies behind Kelly Tripucka who started all 82 games during the 1981–82 season.

On October 5, 2010, Jerebko strained his right Achilles' tendon in a preseason game against the Miami Heat. He subsequently missed the entire 2010–11 season.

On December 9, 2011, Jerebko re-signed with the Pistons on a four-year deal.

Boston Celtics (2015–2017)
On February 19, 2015, Jerebko was traded, along with Luigi Datome, to the Boston Celtics in exchange for Tayshaun Prince.

On July 9, 2015, Jerebko re-signed with the Celtics.

Utah Jazz (2017–2018)
On July 17, 2017, Jerebko signed with the Utah Jazz. On July 7, 2018, he was waived by the Jazz.

Golden State Warriors (2018–2019)
On July 12, 2018, Jerebko signed with the Golden State Warriors. On October 19, he tipped in a shot against his former team with 0.3 seconds remaining to lift the Warriors to a 124–123 victory over the Jazz. On November 13, he posted his 11th career double-double with season bests of 14 points and 14 rebounds in a 110–103 win over the Atlanta Hawks. On December 22, he scored a career-high 23 points on 10-for-12 shooting with six rebounds in 21 minutes off the bench in a 120–116 win over the Dallas Mavericks. The Warriors made it to the 2019 NBA Finals, where they were defeated by the Toronto Raptors in six games.

Khimki (2019–2021)
On August 14, 2019, Jerebko signed with Khimki of the VTB United League and the EuroLeague. On January 23, 2021, Khimki terminated the contract of Jerebko, reportedly due to personal reasons.

CSKA Moscow (2022) 
On March 30, 2022, Jerebko signed with CSKA Moscow for the rest of the season. The news of the signing, which occurred one month after the start of the Russian invasion of Ukraine, was met with widespread criticism in his home country Sweden. He was swiftly suspended from the Sweden national team, and at least one of his main sponsors terminated his contract. On June 18, 2022, Jerebko left CSKA Moscow.

Career statistics

NBA

Regular season

|-
| align="left" | 
| align="left" | Detroit
| 80 || 73 || 27.9 || .481 || .313 || .710 || 6.0 || .7 || 1.0 || .4 || 9.3
|-
| align="left" | 
| align="left" | Detroit
| 64 || 13 || 22.9 || .468 || .302 || .806 || 4.8 || .7 || .6 || .3 || 8.7
|-
| align="left" | 
| align="left" | Detroit
| 49 || 2 || 18.2 || .449 || .301 || .773 || 3.8 || .9 || .8 || .2 || 7.7
|-
| align="left" | 
| align="left" | Detroit
| 64 || 0 || 11.6 || .471 || .419 || .729 || 2.7 || .6 || .3 || .1 || 4.2
|-
| align="left" | 
| align="left" | Detroit
| 46 || 0 || 15.3 || .460 || .368 || .861 || 3.1 || .9|| .6 || .2 || 5.2
|-
| align="left" | 
| align="left" | Boston
| 29 || 0 || 18.2 || .431 || .406 || .833 || 4.8 || 1.0 || .7 || .2 || 7.1
|-
| align="left" | 
| align="left" | Boston
| 78 || 0 || 15.1 || .413 || .398 || .782 || 3.7 || .8 || .3 || .3 || 4.4
|-
| align="left" | 
| align="left" | Boston
| 78 || 6 || 15.8 || .435 || .346 || .703 || 3.5 || .9 || .3 || .2 || 3.8
|-
| align="left" |
| align="left" | Utah
| 74 || 19 || 15.3 || .466 || .414 || .807 || 3.3 || .6 || .3 || .2 || 5.8
|-
| align="left" |
| align="left" | Golden State
| 73 || 6 || 16.7 || .459 || .367 || .800 || 3.9 || 1.3 || .4 || .2 || 6.3
|- class="sortbottom"
| style="text-align:center;" colspan="2"| Career
| 635 || 119 || 17.8 || .457 || .363 || .770 || 4.0 || .8 || .5 || .2 || 6.2

Playoffs

|-
| align="left" | 2015
| align="left" | Boston
| 4 || 0 || 17.0 || .333 || .000 || .500 || 3.5 || .3 || .5 || .3 || 2.8
|-
| align="left" | 2016
| align="left" | Boston
| 6 || 4 || 27.0 || .478 || .318 || .800 || 6.8 || 1.7 || .3 || .7 || 9.2
|-
| align="left" | 2017
| align="left" | Boston
| 12 || 0 || 10.7 || .484 || .333 || 1.000 || 2.4 || 1.0 || .4 || .3 || 3.6
|-
| align="left" | 2018
| align="left" | Utah
| 10 || 0 || 7.9 || .421 || .167 || 1.000 || 1.6 || .3 || .3 || .0 || 1.9
|-
| align="left" | 2019
| align="left" | Golden State
| 16 || 0 || 7.6 || .286 || .263 || .833 || 2.1 || .8 || .1 || .1 || 2.1
|- class="sortbottom"
| style="text-align:center;" colspan="2"| Career
| 48 || 4 || 11.6 || .405 || .273 || .870 || 2.8 || .8 || .3 || .2 || 3.4

National team career

Jerebko debuted for the Swedish national team as an 18-year-old, and has since played for them at the 2013 EuroBasket, 2022 EuroBasket qualifiers, and 2023 World Cup qualifiers. Following his decision of joining CSKA Moscow in the spring of 2022, Jerebko was expelled by the Swedish national team.

Personal life
Jerebko is the son of former Syracuse forward Chris Jerebko, a Russian American who played professionally in Sweden with Borås Basket for five seasons before settling in that country. Jerebko's mother also played basketball professionally. Jerebko and his wife Johanna have two daughters and one son.

On August 26, 2016, Jerebko purchased the Renegades Esports organization from Chris Badawi and Christopher "MonteCristo" Mykles.

See also 

 List of European basketball players in the United States

References

External links

 Jonas Jerebko at euroleague.net
 Jonas Jerebko at legabasket.it
 

1987 births
Living people
BC Khimki players
Boston Celtics players
PBC CSKA Moscow players
Detroit Pistons draft picks
Detroit Pistons players
Esports team owners
Golden State Warriors players
LF Basket Norrbotten players
National Basketball Association players from Sweden
Pallacanestro Biella players
People from Mark Municipality
Power forwards (basketball)
Swedish expatriate basketball people in Italy
Swedish expatriate basketball people in Russia
Swedish expatriate basketball people in the United States
Swedish men's basketball players
Swedish people of American descent
Swedish people of Russian descent
Utah Jazz players
Sportspeople from Västra Götaland County